The 1991 Women's World Chess Championship was won by Xie Jun, who defeated the incumbent champion Maia Chiburdanidze in the title match.

1990 Interzonals

As part of the qualification process, two Interzonal tournaments were held in the summer of 1990, one in Azov in June and the other in the Genting Highlands in Malaysia in June and July, featuring the best players from each FIDE zone. A total of 36 players took part, with the top three from each Interzonal qualifying for the Candidates Tournament.

Kachiani and Galliamova shared first place in Azov, half a point ahead of Klimova-Richtrova, who also advanced to the Candidates.

In Genting, ex-champion Gaprindashvili scored an impressive victory at the age of 49, one point ahead of the almost 30 years younger surprise star Xie, while Marić took the last spot in the Candidates after winning a playoff against Gurieli 3-2.

{| class="wikitable"
|+ 1990 Women's Interzonal, Azov
|-
! !! Player !! Rating !! 1 !! 2 !! 3 !! 4 !! 5 !! 6 !! 7 !! 8 !! 9 !! 10 !! 11 !! 12 !! 13 !! 14 !! 15 !! 16 !! 17 !! 18 !! Points !! Tie break
|- style="background:#ccffcc;"
| 1 ||  || 2365 || - || ½ || ½ || 0 || ½ || 1 || ½ || ½ || 1 || ½ || ½ || 1 || 1 || ½ || 1 || ½ || 1 || 1 || 11½ || 89.50
|- style="background:#ccffcc;"
| 2 ||  || 2365 || ½ || - || ½ || 1 || 1 || 1 || ½ || 0 || 0 || 0 || 1 || 1 || 1 || 1 || 0 || 1 || 1 || 1 || 11½ || 89.25
|- style="background:#ccffcc;"
| 3 ||  || 2355 || ½ || ½ || - || 1 || 0 || 1 || 0 || 1 || 1 || ½ || 1 || ½ || ½ || ½ || 1 || 0 || 1 || 1 || 11 || 
|-
| 4 ||  || 2265 || 1 || 0 || 0 || - || 1 || 1 || 0 || 1 || ½ || 1 || ½ || 0 || ½ || 1 || 0 || 1 || 1 || 1 || 10½ || 
|-
| 5 ||  || 2285 || ½ || 0 || 1 || 0 || - || ½ || 1 || 1 || 0 || ½ || 1 || ½ || 1 || ½ || ½ || 0 || 1 || 1 || 10 || 79.75
|-
| 6 ||  || 2385 || 0 || 0 || 0 || 0 || ½ || - || 1 || 1 || 1 || 1 || 0 || 1 || 1 || 0 || 1 || ½ || 1 || 1 || 10 || 74.75
|-
| 7 ||  || 2305 || ½ || ½ || 1 || 1 || 0 || 0 || - || ½ || 0 || 0 || 0 || 1 || ½ || 1 || 1 || 1 || 1 || 1 || 10 || 74.50
|-
| 8 ||  || 2325 || ½ || 1 || 0 || 0 || 0 || 0 || ½ || - || 1 || 1 || 0 || 1 || ½ || ½ || 1 || 1 || 1 || 1 || 10 || 74.00
|-
| 9 ||  || 2405 || 0 || 1 || 0 || ½ || 1 || 0 || 1 || 0 || - || ½ || 1 || 0 || ½ || ½ || 1 || 1 || ½ || 1 || 9½ || 72.72
|-
| 10 ||  || 2270 || ½ || 1 || ½ || 0 || ½ || 0 || 1 || 0 || ½ || - || ½ || 0 || ½ || ½ || 1 || 1 || 1 || 1 || 9½ || 70.75
|-
| 11 ||  || 2315 || ½ || 0 || 0 || ½ || 0 || 1 || 1 || 1 || 0 || ½ || - || 1 || 0 || 1 || ½ || 1 || 0 || 1 || 9 || 71.75
|-
| 12 ||  || 2205 || 0 || 0 || ½ || 1 || ½ || 0 || 0 || 0 || 1 || 1 || 0 || - || 0 || 1 || 1 || 1 || 1 || 1 || 9 || 63.50
|-
| 13 ||  || 2335 || 0 || 0 || ½ || ½ || 0 || 0 || ½ || ½ || ½ || ½ || 1 || 1 || - || 0 || 1 || 0 || 1 || 1 || 8 || 
|-
| 14 ||  || 2270 || ½ || 0 || ½ || 0 || ½ || 1 || 0 || ½ || ½ || ½ || 0 || 0 || 1 || - || 0 || 1 || ½ || 1 || 7½ || 
|-
| 15 ||  || 2230 || 0 || 1 || 0 || 1 || ½ || 0 || 0 || 0 || 0 || 0 || ½ || 0 || 0 || 1 || - || 1 || 1 || 1 || 7 || 
|-
| 16 ||  || 2025 || ½ || 0 || 1 || 0 || 1 || ½ || 0 || 0 || 0 || 0 || 0 || 0 || 1 || 0 || 0 || - || 0 || ½ || 4½ || 
|-
| 17 ||  || 2115 || 0 || 0 || 0 || 0 || 0 || 0 || 0 || 0 || ½ || 0 || 1 || 0 || 0 || ½ || 0 || 1 || - || 0 || 3 || 
|-
| 18 ||  || 2045 || 0 || 0 || 0 || 0 || 0 || 0 || 0 || 0 || 0 || 0 || 0 || 0 || 0 || 0 || 0 || ½ || 1 || - || 1½ || 
|}

{| class="wikitable"
|+ 1990 Women's Interzonal, Genting Highlands
|-
! !! Player !! 1 !! 2 !! 3 !! 4 !! 5 !! 6 !! 7 !! 8 !! 9 !! 10 !! 11 !! 12 !! 13 !! 14 !! 15 !! 16 !! 17 !! 18 !! Points !! Tie break
|- style="background:#ccffcc;"
| 1 ||  || - || 1 || ½ || ½ || 0 || 1 || 1 || 1 || 1 || 1 || ½ || 1 || 0 || 1 || 1 || 1 || 1 || 1 || 13½ || 
|- style="background:#ccffcc;"
| 2 ||  || 0 || - || ½ || ½ || ½ || 1 || 0 || 1 || 0 || 1 || 1 || 1 || 1 || 1 || 1 || 1 || 1 || 1 || 12½ || 
|- style="background:#ccffcc;"
| 3 ||  || ½ || ½ || - || ½ || ½ || 1 || ½ || 1 || 1 || 0 || ½ || 1 || 1 || 1 || ½ || 1 || ½ || 1 || 12 || 93.25
|-
| 4 ||  || ½ || ½ || ½ || - || 1 || ½ || ½ || 1 || ½ || ½ || 1 || ½ || ½ || 1 || ½ || 1 || 1 || 1 || 12 || 92.50
|-
| 5 ||  || 1 || ½ || ½ || 0 || - || ½ || 0 || ½ || 1 || 1 || ½ || 1 || ½ || 1 || 1 || ½ || ½ || 1 || 11 || 85.75
|-
| 6 ||  || 0 || 0 || 0 || ½ || ½ || - || 0 || 1 || ½ || 1 || 1 || 1 || 1 || ½ || 1 || 1 || 1 || 1 || 11 || 74.25
|-
| 7 ||  || 0 || 1 || ½ || ½ || 1 || 1 || - || 0 || 0 || ½ || 1 || 1 || ½ || 1 || 1 || ½ || 0 || 1 || 10½ || 
|-
| 8 ||  || 0 || 0 || 0 || 0 || ½ || 0 || 1 || - || 1 || 1 || 1 || ½ || 1 || ½ || 1 || 1 || ½ || 1 || 10 || 
|-
| 9 ||  || 0 || 1 || 0 || ½ || 0 || ½ || 1 || 0 || - || 0 || 1 || 1 || ½ || ½ || 1 || ½ || 1 || 1 || 9½ || 67.50
|-
| 10 ||  || 0 || 0 || 1 || ½ || 0 || 0 || ½ || 0 || 1 || - || 0 || ½ || 1 || 1 || 1 || 1 || 1 || 1 || 9½ || 63.50
|-
| 11 ||  || ½ || 0 || ½ || 0 || ½ || 0 || 0 || 0 || 0 || 1 || - || 0 || 1 || 1 || ½ || 1 || 1 || ½ || 7½ || 
|-
| 12 ||  || 0 || 0 || 0 || ½ || 0 || 0 || 0 || ½ || 0 || ½ || 1 || - || ½ || ½ || ½ || ½ || 1 || 1 || 6½ || 
|-
| 13 ||  || 1 || 0 || 0 || ½ || ½ || 0 || ½ || 0 || ½ || 0 || 0 || ½ || - || 0 || ½ || 0 || 1 || 1 || 6 || 45.75
|-
| 14 ||  || 0 || 0 || 0 || 0 || 0 || ½ || 0 || ½ || ½ || 0 || 0 || ½ || 1 || - || ½ || 1 || ½ || 1 || 6 || 35.25
|-
| 15 ||  || 0 || 0 || ½ || ½ || 0 || 0 || 0 || 0 || 0 || 0 || ½ || ½ || ½ || ½ || - || 1 || 1 || 1 || 6 || 34.50
|-
| 16 ||  || 0 || 0 || 0 || 0 || ½ || 0 || ½ || 0 || ½ || 0 || 0 || ½ || 1 || 0 || 0 || - || 1 || 1 || 5 || 
|-
| 17 ||  || 0 || 0 || ½ || 0 || ½ || 0 || 1 || ½ || 0 || 0 || 0 || 0 || 0 || ½ || 0 || 0 || - || ½ || 3½ || 
|-
| 18 || || 0 || 0 || 0 || 0 || 0 || 0 || 0 || 0 || 0 || 0 || ½ || 0 || 0 || 0 || 0 || 0 || ½ || - || 1 || 
|}

1990 Candidates Tournament

The six qualifiers from the Interzonals were joined by the top two from the previous Candidates: Ioseliani and Akhmilovskaya.

Like the previous two cycles, the Candidates Tournament in this cycle was contested as a round-robin tournament in Borzomi in October 1990. Somewhat unexpectedly, the two 20-year-olds Xie and Marić tied for first place. Xie won the playoff in Belgrade and Beijing in February 1991 by 4½-2½, earning the right to challenge the reigning champion for the title.

{| class="wikitable"
|+ 1990 Women's Candidates Tournament
|-
! !! Player !! 1 !! 2 !! 3 !! 4 !! 5 !! 6 !! 7 !! 8 !! Points !! Tie break
|- style="background:#ccffcc;"
| 1 ||  || - || 1 || 0 || 1 || 1 || 1 || 0 || ½ || 4½ || 16.00
|-
| 2 ||  || 0 || - || 1 || ½ || 1 || ½ || 1 || ½ || 4½ || 14.50
|-
| 3 ||  || 1 || 0 || - || 0 || 1 || 1 || ½ || ½ || 4 || 13.25
|-
| 4 ||  || 0 || ½ || 1 || - || ½ || ½ || ½ || 1 || 4 || 12.75
|-
| 5 ||  || 0 || 0 || 0 || ½ || - || 1 || 1 || 1 || 3½ || 
|-
| 6 ||  || 0 || ½ || 0 || ½ || 0 || - || 1 || 1 || 3 || 
|-
| 7 ||  || 1 || 0 || ½ || ½ || 0 || 0 || - || ½ || 2½ || 
|-
| 8 ||  || ½ || ½ || ½ || 0 || 0 || 0 || ½ || - || 2 || 
|}

1991 Championship Match

The championship match was played in Manila in 1991. In a result that came as a surprise to most of the chess world, the relatively unknown Chinese challenger Xie won 4 games (against 2) and the match, ending Chiburdanidze's 13-year reign as world champion.

{| class="wikitable" style="text-align:center"
|+Women's World Championship Match 1991
|-
! !! 1 !! 2 !! 3 !! 4 !! 5 !! 6 !! 7 !! 8 !! 9 !! 10 !! 11 !! 12 !! 13 !! 14 !! 15 !! Total
|-
| align=left | 
| ½ ||style="background:black; color:white"| ½ || 1 ||style="background:black; color:white"| 0 || 0 ||style="background:black; color:white"| ½ || ½ ||style="background:black; color:white"| 1 || ½ ||style="background:black; color:white"| ½ || 1 ||style="background:black; color:white"| ½ || 1 ||style="background:black; color:white"| ½ || ½ || 8½
|-
| align=left | 
|style="background:black; color:white"| ½ || ½ ||style="background:black; color:white"| 0 || 1 ||style="background:black; color:white"| 1 || ½ ||style="background:black; color:white"| ½ || 0 ||style="background:black; color:white"| ½ || ½ ||style="background:black; color:white"| 0 || ½ ||style="background:black; color:white"| 0 || ½ ||style="background:black; color:white"| ½ || 6½
|}

References

Women's World Chess Championships
1991 in chess
1991 in Philippine sport